Manduca tucumana is a moth of the  family Sphingidae.

Distribution 
It is known from Argentina and Bolivia.

Description 
The wingspan is about 108 mm. It is similar in appearance to several other members of the genus Manduca, but a number of differences distinguish it from Manduca pellenia and Manduca scutata, to which it most closely compares, particularly in its distinctly paler head, thorax and forewing and the almost white discal spot, pale lines and fringe on the forewing upperside. The abdomen underside is somewhat buffish.

Biology 
Adults have been recorded in March and from November to December in Argentina indicating at least two generations.

References

Manduca
Moths described in 1903